Katrina Robinson (born January 13, 1981) is an American former politician who served in the Tennessee Senate from the 33rd district from 2019 to 2022 as a member of the Democratic Party. She was the first sitting member of the state senate to be indicted since Operation Tennessee Waltz and later became the first person to ever be expelled from the state senate.

Robinson was born in Memphis, Tennessee, educated at the University of Memphis and Union University, and founded a nursing college in 2015. She was elected to the state senate in the 2018 election after defeating incumbent Senator Reginald Tate in the Democratic primary.

Robinson was indicted on forty-eight charges relating to the embezzlement of $600,000 from federal grants to her nursing school in 2020. The charges against her were reduced to twenty before Judge Sheryl H. Lipman acquitted her on fifteen charges. She was found guilty on four counts of wire fraud in 2021.

Early life

Katrina Robinson was born on January 13, 1981, in Memphis, Tennessee. From 1998 to 2008, she attended the University of Memphis and graduated with a Bachelor of Business Administration in marketing management. In 2010, she graduated from Union University with a Bachelor of Science in Nursing.

Career

Nursing college

In 2015, Robinson founded The Healthcare Institute, a nursing college, and received $1.6 million in grants from the United States Department of Health and Human Services. She received a total of $2.2 million in federal grants from 2015 to 2019. The Healthcare Institute started with two students and later expanded to over six hundred students.

Tennessee Senate

In 2018, Robinson was elected to the Tennessee Senate from the 33rd district as a member of the Democratic Party. On January 29, 2018, Robinson announced that she would run in the Democratic primary. She defeated incumbent Senator Reginald Tate in the Democratic primary and faced no opposition in the general election. Tate had been censured by the Shelby County Democratic Party and Robinson was endorsed by United States Representative Steve Cohen and Senate Minority Leader Sara Kyle.

Criminal conviction

In 2016, an investigation into Robinson was started after an anonymous complaint to the Department of Health and Human Services reported that she had used $550 of federal grant money to purchase a Louis Vuitton handbag. On February 21 and July 28, 2020, the Federal Bureau of Investigation executed search warrants at Robinson's house and nursing school. On July 30, Robinson was indicted on 48 charges, 24 charges of theft and embezzlement from government programs, and 24 charges of wire fraud, by the U.S. District Court for the Western District of Tennessee. The Federal Bureau of Investigation reported that her expenses included a trip to Montego Bay, Jamaica which lasted six days, $2,929.26 spent at Wayfair, $856 spent on a Carnival Cruise Line, and $54,000 for a retirement fund.

Robinson was accused of stealing $600,000 from $2.2 million in federal grants given to her nursing school from 2015 to 2019. She was the first sitting member of the Tennessee Senate to be indicted since Operation Tennessee Waltz in 2005.

On August 12, 2020, she pleaded not guilty, but was found guilty on four of the five charges of wire fraud on September 30, 2021. The forty-eight charges were reduced to twenty charges and Judge Sheryl H. Lipman acquitted her of fifteen of the counts stating that the evidence matched to different theories which could cause a mistrial if theories were switched during the trial. Her sentencing will be on January 5, 2022. A federal case against her, Katie Ayers, and Brooke Boudreaux was dismissed by Lipman after Robinson agreed to complete at twelve month diversion period.

Lieutenant Governor Randy McNally called for Robinson to resign following her conviction. Robinson claims that she was "targeted for prosecution" and Representative Torrey Harris opposes forcing her out of the legislature and claimed that "there was no evidence presented that she misappropriated less than $3,500 from her own business". Robinson became the first member of the state senate to be expelled when the state senate voted twenty-seven to five, with all Republicans voting in favor and all Democrats voting against, on February 2, 2022, to remove her.

Electoral history

References

External links
 
 Katrina Robinson campaign website
 Katrina Robinson on Twitter
 Department of Justice news release

1981 births
21st-century American politicians
21st-century American women politicians
Living people
Politicians from Memphis, Tennessee
Democratic Party Tennessee state senators
Women state legislators in Tennessee
People expelled from United States state legislatures
Politicians convicted of mail and wire fraud
Tennessee politicians convicted of crimes
African-American state legislators in Tennessee
African-American women in politics
21st-century African-American women
21st-century African-American politicians